Veterans Memorial Park is a  urban park along the Boise River in Boise, Idaho, USA. The park is managed by the Boise Parks and Recreation Department and includes picnic facilities, play areas, and memorials to veterans and fallen soldiers. Although managed by Boise Parks and Recreation, Veterans Memorial Park is not a city park but an Idaho state park.

History
The park was constructed on the site of the former Idaho Soldiers Home. Also known as the Old Soldier's Home, the facility opened in 1895 and closed in 1966. Veterans Memorial State Park opened on the property in 1976.

See also
 List of parks in Boise

References

External links

River by Design See page 71 for site history.
Photograph with documentation of Idaho Soldiers Home (c1915)

Parks in Idaho
Boise, Idaho
Monuments and memorials in the United States